The Boulder Monitor is a weekly newspaper in Boulder, Montana in the United States.

History
The Boulder Monitor was established in 1907. Between 1915 and 1969 the newspaper was published by Adolph Eiselein. From 1977 to 2002 The Boulder Monitor was owned by Vern Sutherlin. That year, it was purchased by Boulder residents David and Jan Anderson, who had founded the competing Jefferson County Courier in 1997. The Jefferson County Courier and The Boulder Monitor were merged by the Andersons in 2011, continuing under the latter newspaper's name.

In December 2011 "The Boulder Monitor" sued the Jefferson High School District over what the newspaper alleged was an open meeting violation. In February 2012 the board admitted conducting business via email with no public notice, a violation of Montana's open meeting provisions, and the newspaper dropped the suit.
In 2014 The Boulder Monitor again sued the Jefferson County School District over what the newspaper alleged was the district's failure to provide public notice of a school board meeting when a quorum of the board was present at an unannounced committee meeting. The case was ultimately decided by the Montana Supreme Court which ruled that the district's failure to publish notice was not a violation of Montana's open meetings statutes as the meeting in question was a committee hearing and not an assembly of the full board. 

In 2017 the newspaper was listed for sale for $102,500. It was purchased in 2018 by Keith Hammonds and Jackie Dyer.

Reputation
In 2008 The Boulder Monitor received the Thomas Dimsdale Sweepstakes Award from the Montana Newspaper Association for "best weekly newspaper in Montana".

See also
 List of newspapers in Montana

References

Newspapers published in Montana
Weekly newspapers published in the United States
1907 establishments in Montana